Segetibacter aerophilus is a Gram-negative, rod-shaped, strictly aerobic and non-spore-forming bacterium from the genus of Segetibacter which has been isolated from air.

References

External links
Type strain of Segetibacter aerophilus at BacDive -  the Bacterial Diversity Metadatabase

Chitinophagia
Bacteria described in 2010